Coleman Randolph Hawkins (November 21, 1904 – May 19, 1969), nicknamed "Hawk" and sometimes "Bean", was an American jazz tenor saxophonist. One of the first prominent jazz musicians on his instrument, as Joachim E. Berendt explained: "there were some tenor players before him, but the instrument was not an acknowledged jazz horn". Hawkins biographer John Chilton described the prevalent styles of tenor saxophone solos prior to Hawkins as "mooing" and "rubbery belches."  Hawkins cited as influences Happy Caldwell, Stump Evans, and Prince Robinson, although he was the first to tailor his method of improvisation to the saxophone rather than imitate the techniques of the clarinet. Hawkins' virtuosic, arpeggiated approach to improvisation, with his characteristic rich, emotional, and vibrato-laden tonal style, was the main influence on a generation of tenor players that included Chu Berry, Charlie Barnet, Tex Beneke, Ben Webster, Vido Musso, Herschel Evans, Buddy Tate, and Don Byas, and through them the later tenormen, Arnett Cobb, Illinois Jacquet, Flip Phillips, Ike Quebec, Al Sears, Paul Gonsalves, and Lucky Thompson.  While Hawkins became known with swing music during the big band era, he had a role in the development of bebop in the 1940s.

Fellow saxophonist Lester Young, known as the "President of the Tenor Saxophone," commented, in a 1959 interview with The Jazz Review: "As far as I'm concerned, I think Coleman Hawkins was the president, first, right? As far as myself, I think I'm the second one." Miles Davis once said: "When I heard Hawk, I learned to play ballads."

Early life
Hawkins was born in Saint Joseph, Missouri, United States, in 1904. He was named Coleman after his mother Cordelia's maiden name. There is record of Hawkins' parents' first child, a girl, being born in 1901 and dying at the age of two. 
He attended high school in Chicago, then in Topeka, Kansas at Topeka High School. He later stated that he studied harmony and composition for two years at Washburn College in Topeka while still attending high school. In his youth, he played piano and cello, and started playing saxophone at the age of nine; by the age of fourteen he was playing around eastern Kansas.

The origin of Hawkins' nickname, "Bean", is not clear. Theories around the nickname's basis include a reference to Hawkins' head shape, his frugality (saying "I haven't a bean") or due to his immense knowledge of chords.

Later life and career

1921–1939

Hawkins's first significant gig was with Mamie Smith's Jazz Hounds in 1921, and he was with the band full-time from April 1922 to 1923, when he settled in New York City. In the Jazz Hounds, he coincided with Garvin Bushell, Everett Robbins, Bubber Miley and Herb Flemming. Hawkins joined Fletcher Henderson's Orchestra, where he remained until 1934, sometimes doubling on clarinet and bass saxophone. Hawkins's playing changed significantly during Louis Armstrong's tenure with the Henderson Orchestra (1924–25). In the late 1920s, Hawkins participated in some of the earliest integrated recording sessions with the Mound City Blue Blowers. During his time with Henderson, he became a star soloist with increasing prominence on records. While with the band, he and Henry "Red" Allen recorded a series of small group sides for ARC (on their Perfect, Melotone, Romeo, and Oriole labels). Hawkins also recorded a number of solo recordings with either piano or a pick-up band of Henderson's musicians in 1933–34, just prior to his period in Europe. He was also featured on a Benny Goodman session on February 2, 1934 for Columbia, which also featured Mildred Bailey as guest vocalist.

In late 1934, Hawkins accepted an invitation to play with Jack Hylton's orchestra in London, and toured Europe as a soloist until 1939, performing and recording with Django Reinhardt and Benny Carter in Paris in 1937. During Hawkins' time touring Europe between 1934 and 1939, attention in the U.S. shifted to other tenor saxophonists, including Lester Young, Ben Webster, and Chu Berry. Following his return to the United States, he quickly re-established himself as one of the leading figures on the instrument by adding innovations to his earlier style.

On October 11, 1939, he recorded a two-chorus performance of the standard "Body and Soul", which he had been performing at Bert Kelly's New York venue, Kelly's Stables. In a landmark recording of the swing era, captured as an afterthought at the session, Hawkins ignores almost all of the melody, with only the first four bars stated in a recognizable fashion. Hawkins' departure from the melodic themes of the tune, use of upper chord intervals, and implied passing chords in that recording have been described as "one of the early tremors of bebop."

Loren Schoenberg, Director of National Jazz Museum in Harlem, states that “no matter how nonchalantly Hawkins tried to make the choice to record "Body And Soul" seem, it had long been his encore during his European years, and he had a lot riding on this session. Lester Young was at his zenith with the Basie band, and virtually all of the other major bands had a Hawkins-styled tenor in a featured position. The decades as a musical omnivore came to fruition as he signaled to pianist Gene Rodgers to make an introduction in Db. The sounds of Bach, Tatum, Armstrong, and the untold musicians who had filled his head and ears culminated in one of the greatest spontaneous set of variations ever recorded.”

The 1940s and 1950s

After a brief period in 1940 leading a big band, Hawkins led small groups at Kelly's Stables on Manhattan's 52nd Street. During 1944, He recorded in small and large groups for the Keynote, Savoy, and Apollo labels. Hawkins always had a keen ear for new talent and styles, and he was the leader on what is generally considered to have been the first ever bebop recording session on February 16, 1944 including Dizzy Gillespie, Don Byas, Clyde Hart, Oscar Pettiford, and Max Roach. On October 19, 1944, he led another bebop recording session with Thelonious Monk on piano, Edward Robinson on bass, and Denzil Best on drums.

Given his love of Bach and Pablo Casals and his own unquenchable thirst for self-expression, it was inevitable that Hawkins would move towards solo performances. During his European tour, he began surrounding his songs with unaccompanied introductions and codas. In January 1945 he recorded Solo Sessions.  Harry Lim, a Javanese jazz lover who came to America in 1939, first produced jam sessions in Chicago and New York and then founded Keynote Records, a premier small jazz label. In an article for Metronome magazine in May, 1944, Lim dubbed Hawkins “the Picasso of Jazz”.

In 1945, he recorded extensively with small groups with Best and either Robinson or Pettiford on bass, Sir Charles Thompson on piano, Allan Reuss on guitar, Howard McGhee on trumpet, and Vic Dickenson on trombone, in sessions reflecting a highly individual style with an indifference toward the categories of "modern" and "traditional" jazz. That general period saw him recording with such diverse stylists as Sid Catlett, Tyree Glenn, Hilton Jefferson (a Fletcher Henderson colleague), Hank Jones, Billy Taylor, J. J. Johnson and Fats Navarro. He also toured with Jazz at the Philharmonic (JATP). Hawkins divided his time between New York and Europe, making numerous freelance recordings.

In the 1950s, Hawkins performed with musicians such as Red Allen and Roy Eldridge, with whom he appeared at the 1957 Newport Jazz Festival and recorded Coleman Hawkins Encounters Ben Webster with fellow tenor saxophonist Ben Webster along with Oscar Peterson, Herb Ellis, Ray Brown, and Alvin Stoller. His 1957 album The Hawk Flies High, with Idrees Sulieman, J. J. Johnson, Hank Jones, Barry Galbraith, Oscar Pettiford, and Jo Jones, shows his interest in modern jazz styles, during a period better known for his playing with more traditional musicians.

Hawkins' interest in more modern styles manifested in a reunion with Monk, with whom he had remained close even though they had not played together for over a decade. Monk led a June 1957 session featuring Hawkins and John Coltrane, that yielded Monk's Music, issued later that summer. Outtakes from this session comprised half of the tracks on Thelonious Monk with John Coltrane, released on the Jazzland Records subsidiary of Riverside Records in 1961.

1960–1969
In the 1960s, Hawkins appeared regularly at the Village Vanguard in Manhattan. In 1960, he participated in the recording of Max Roach's We Insist! suite, part of the political and social linkages developing between jazz and the civil rights movement. At the behest of Impulse Records producer Bob Thiele, Hawkins availed himself of a long-desired opportunity to record with Duke Ellington for the 1962 album Duke Ellington Meets Coleman Hawkins, alongside Ellington band members Johnny Hodges, Lawrence Brown, Ray Nance, and Harry Carney as well as the Duke. Sessions for Impulse with his performing quartet yielded Today and Now, also in 1962 and judged one of his better latter-day efforts by The Penguin Guide to Jazz Recordings. Hawkins recorded in 1963 alongside Sonny Rollins for their collaborative album Sonny Meets Hawk!, for RCA Victor.

It was shortly after this busy period that Hawkins fell into the grip of depression and heavy drinking and his recording output began to wane. His last recording was in 1967; Hawkins died of liver disease on May 19, 1969, at Wickersham Hospital, in Manhattan. He was survived by his widow, Dolores, and by three children: a son, Rene, and two daughters, Colette and Mimi. Hawkins is interred in the Yew Plot at the Woodlawn Cemetery in The Bronx, New York City.

The Song of the Hawk, a 1990 biography written by British jazz historian John Chilton, chronicles Hawkins's career.

Discography

As leader/co-leader
Rainbow Mist (Delmark, 1944 [1992]) compilation of Apollo recordings
Indispensable (1927-1956, RCA, compilation: 1984)
Body and Soul (1939–1956, RCA, first as LP, ca. 1976, then as CD, 1996)
Disorder at the Border (Spotlite, 1952 [1973])
The Hawk Talks (Decca, 1952-53 [1955])
The Hawk Returns (Savoy, 1954)
Timeless Jazz (Jazztone, 1954) also released as Jazz Tones (Xanadu, 1954 [1984])
Accent on Tenor Sax (Urania, 1955)
The Hawk in Hi Fi (RCA Victor, 1956) with Billy Byers and his orchestra
The Hawk in Paris (Vik, 1956) with Manny Albam and his orchestra
The Gilded Hawk (Capitol, 1956–57) with Glen Osser and his orchestra
The Hawk Flies High (Riverside, 1957)
The Coleman Hawkins, Roy Eldridge, Pete Brown, Jo Jones All Stars at Newport (Verve, 1957)
Coleman Hawkins Encounters Ben Webster (Verve, 1957) with Ben Webster
The Genius of Coleman Hawkins (Verve, 1957)
Coleman Hawkins and Confrères (Verve, 1958) with the Oscar Peterson Trio, Roy Eldridge and Ben Webster
The High and Mighty Hawk (Felsted, 1958)
The Saxophone Section (World Wide, 1958)
Bean Bags (Atlantic, 1958) with Milt Jackson
Soul (Prestige, 1958)
Hawk Eyes (Prestige, 1959)
Coleman Hawkins with the Red Garland Trio (Moodsville, 1959) with Red Garland
Coleman Hawkins All Stars (Swingville, 1960) with Joe Thomas and Vic Dickenson
At Ease with Coleman Hawkins (Moodsville, 1960)
Coleman Hawkins and His Orchestra (Crown, 1960)
The Hawk Swings (Crown, 1960)
Night Hawk (Swingville, 1960) with Eddie "Lockjaw" Davis
The Hawk Relaxes (Moodsville, 1961)
Things Ain't What They Used to Be (Swingville, 1961) as part of the Prestige Swing Festival
Jazz Reunion (Candid, 1961) with Pee Wee Russell
Good Old Broadway (Moodsville 1962)
The Jazz Version of No Strings (Moodsville, 1962)
Hawkins! Eldridge! Hodges! Alive! At the Village Gate! (Verve, 1962) with Johnny Hodges and Roy Eldridge
Hawkins! Alive! At the Village Gate (Verve, 1962)
Coleman Hawkins Plays Make Someone Happy from Do Re Mi (Moodsville, 1962)
Duke Ellington Meets Coleman Hawkins (Impulse!, 1962) with Duke Ellington
Today and Now (Impulse!, 1962)
Desafinado (Impulse!, 1962)
Back in Bean's Bag (Columbia, 1963) with Clark Terry
Sonny Meets Hawk! (RCA Victor, 1963) with Sonny Rollins
Wrapped Tight (Impulse!, 1965)
The Hawk & the Hunter (Mira, 1965)
The Greatest Jazz Concert in the World (Pablo, 1967)
Sirius (Pablo, 1975 - recorded December 20, 1966 in New York)
The Best of Coleman Hawkins (Original Jazz Classics, a 2004 compilation of 1958-1962 recordings)

As sideman
With Kenny Burrell
Bluesy Burrell (Moodsville, 1962)
With Benny Carter
Further Definitions (Impulse!, 1961)
With Buck Clayton
Jumpin' at the Woodside (Columbia, 1955)
All the Cats Join In (Columbia 1956)
With Eddie "Lockjaw" Davis
Very Saxy (Prestige, 1959)
With Dizzy Gillespie
The Complete RCA Victor Recordings (Bluebird, 1937–1949 [1995])
With Tiny Grimes
Blues Groove (Prestige, 1958)
With Fletcher Henderson
A Study in Frustration (Columbia, 1927–1936)
Hocus Pocus (RCA, 1927–1936)
With Lambert, Hendricks & Bavan
At Newport '63 (RCA Victor, 1963)
With Abbey Lincoln
 Straight Ahead (Candid, 1961)
With Shelly Manne
2-3-4 (Impulse!, 1962)
With Thelonious Monk
Monk's Music (1957)
Thelonious Monk with John Coltrane (Riverside, 1957)
With Bob Prince
Saxes Inc. (1959)
With Django Reinhardt 
And His American Friends (various labels, ca. 1935–1937)
Django Reinhardt Collection (Fabulous, 1935-1946 [2014])
With Max Roach
We Insist! (Candid, 1960)
With Rex Stewart and Cootie Williams
The Big Challenge (Jazztone, 1957)
With Ben Webster
Ben Webster and Associates (Verve, 1959)
With Randy Weston
Live at the Five Spot (United Artists, 1959)
With Joe Williams
At Newport '63 (RCA Victor, 1963)

References

External links

 Coleman Hawkins recordings at the Discography of American Historical Recordings.
BookRags biography
The Red Hot Jazz Archive biography
Jazz for Beginners biography
Coleman Hawkins videography
Coleman Hawkins Legacy Jazz Festival
Archived NYT Obituary for Coleman Hawkins

African-American jazz musicians
American jazz tenor saxophonists
American male saxophonists
Big band bandleaders
Bebop saxophonists
1904 births
1969 deaths
Jazz musicians from New York (state)
Musicians from Chicago
Musicians from New York City
Apollo Records artists
Candid Records artists
Deaths from pneumonia in New York City
Gennett Records artists
Impulse! Records artists
Manor Records artists
Parrot Records (blues label) artists
People from St. Joseph, Missouri
Musicians from Topeka, Kansas
Custom Records artists
Prestige Records artists
Savoy Records artists
Swing saxophonists
Verve Records artists
Xanadu Records artists
20th-century American saxophonists
Jazz musicians from Illinois
Jazz musicians from Missouri
20th-century American male musicians
American male jazz musicians
The Chocolate Dandies members
Orchestra U.S.A. members
Burials at Woodlawn Cemetery (Bronx, New York)
Black & Blue Records artists
Black Lion Records artists
Fresh Sounds Records artists
20th-century African-American musicians
Signature Records artists